Col de San Colombano is a mountain pass in Corsica.

Location

The Col de San Colombano is in the north of the Monte Cinto massif. 
It separates the  Cima di l'Alturaia to the east from the  Bocca di u Prunu to the west
It leads from the valley of the Ostriconi river to the east to the valley of the Fiume di Regino to the west.
The T301 road leads through the pass.
The crest is on the boundary between the communes of Palasca to the north and Olmi-Cappella to the south.

History

The pass has long been an important military importance, as shown by the ruins of the Castello de San Colombano de Giussani above the pass.
This castle was first mentioned in 1289, and was the main fortress of the Marquises of Massa and Corsica.

References

Sources

Mountain passes of Haute-Corse